Chirnside railway station served the village of Chirnside, Scottish Borders, Scotland from 1863 to 1965 on the Berwickshire Railway.

History 
The station opened in 1863 by the North British Railway. The station was situated north of Chirnsidebridge Paper Mill and adjacent to Chirnside Mill. The station closed to passengers in September 1951 and to goods traffic in 1965. The stationmaster's house, office and station building survive.

References

External links 

Disused railway stations in the Scottish Borders
Former North British Railway stations
Railway stations in Great Britain opened in 1863
Railway stations in Great Britain closed in 1951
1863 establishments in Scotland
1965 disestablishments in Scotland